Rhytidogyne is an Asian genus of bush crickets in the tribe Agraeciini, belonging to the 'conehead' subfamily Conocephalinae.

The Orthoptera Species File lists this genus as monotypic with the single species Rhytidogyne griffinii (Karny, 1907), which is found only in Vietnam.

References

External links 
 
 Images on OSF

Conocephalinae
Tettigoniidae genera
Orthoptera of Indo-China